Prosintis is a genus of moths in the family Blastobasidae. It contains the single species Prosintis florivora, which is found in India.

References

Blastobasidae genera
Monotypic moth genera
Moths of Asia